Garfield Charles (born 20 October 1963) is a Guyanese cricketer. He played in 34 first-class and 16 List A matches for Guyana and Demerara from 1982 to 1991.

Charles has been a coach since he retired from playing. He has a level 3 New Zealand Cricket coaching qualification along with a Bachelor in Sport Coaching and a Diploma in Sport Psychology. He has coached in Guyana, The Netherlands and in Canterbury, New Zealand, where he is the head coach for the Mid Canterbury Cricket Association in Ashburton.

See also
 List of Guyanese representative cricketers

References

External links
 

1963 births
Living people
Guyanese cricketers
Guyanese cricket coaches
Guyana cricketers